Ministry of Security and Public Administration (MOSPA, Korean: 안전행정부), formerly Ministry of Public Administration and Security (MOPAS), was a ministry of the national government of South Korea. The ministry was in charge of the civil and domestic affairs in South Korea including the National Police Agency and the National Emergency Management Agency.

Its headquarters were in the Seoul Government Complex in Jongno District, Seoul.

In November 2014, the ministry was separated into Ministry of Government Administration and Home Affairs, Ministry of Public Safety and Security and Ministry of Personnel Management.

Agencies
 National Police Agency
 National Emergency Management Agency

Affiliated organizations
 Central Officials Training Institute
 Appeals Commission
 National Archives of Korea
 Administration Office of Government Complex
 National Computing and Information Agency
 The Committee for the Five Northern Korean Provinces
 National Forensic Service

See also 
Web compatibility issues in South Korea
 Ministry of the Interior and Safety (South Korea)

References

External links

 Ministry of Public Administration and Security

Public Administration and Security
South Korea
Law enforcement in South Korea
Public safety ministries